Frozen Assets is a 1978 play by Barrie Keeffe, written for the Royal Shakespeare Company. The play is "about what happens to a youth after he kills a prison guard". A production of the play was put on by director Will MacAdam at the NY Theatre Ensemble in 1983. Clive Mantle starred in a radio adaption of it. A revival of the play was put on by the Shattered Globe Theatre of Chicago under Nick Bowling from January 1999. It was praised by the Chicago Sun-Times as "hugely entertaining", a "marvelous blend of satire and social commentary and class-based screwball comedy". In 1989 Frozen Assets was also staged at the Half Moon Theatre in Stepney, East London with Marc Tufano playing the lead role of Buddy Clark.

References

1978 plays
British plays
Comedy plays
British radio dramas